Edgemere may refer to a community in the United States:

 Edgemere, Maryland, an unincorporated community and census-designated place in Baltimore County, Maryland
 Edgemere, Queens, a neighborhood in the New York City borough of Queens